This is a list of the operas performed by Glyndebourne Festival Opera during the music directorship (1934-1951) of Fritz Busch.  Operas performed at venues other than Glyndebourne by Glyndebourne forces are also included, as are operas performed at Glyndebourne by other companies.

Sources

See also
 Glyndebourne Festival Opera: history and repertoire 1952-1963

References

Glyndebourne Festival Opera
Opera-related lists
1934 music festivals
British music-related lists
1950s in British music
1940s in British music
1930s in British music